Adithya Institute of Technology (AIT), located at Coimbatore, Tamil Nadu, India, is a private self-financing engineering Institute, adithya Institute of Technology is an engineering college in Coimbatore. The college is approved by AICTE and is affiliated to the Anna University Coimbatore. The college was established in 2008.

Location 
The college is located at Sathy Main Road in Kurumbapalayam SSKulam, Coimbatore.

Academics 
The college offers five courses in Bachelor of Engineering (B.E.), one course in Bachelor of Technology (BTech), three courses in Master of Engineering (M.E.) and a Master of Business Administration (M.B.A) course. All courses are affiliated to Anna University of Technology, Coimbatore.

Departments 
 Department of Mechanical Engineering 
 Department of Electronics and Communication Engineering
 Department of Computer Science and Engineering
 Department of Information Technology
 Department of Science and Humanities
 Department of Electrical and Electronic Engineering
 Department of Civil Engineering

Admission procedure 
Undergraduate students are admitted based on their 12th standard (higher secondary school) scores. The admissions are done as per government of Tamil Nadu norms through TNEA (Tamil Nadu Engineering Admissions) counselling done by the Anna University and through regulated management seat procedures done by the Consortium of Private Self Financing Arts, Science and Engineering Colleges. In every course, 65% of the seats are filled through counselling and 35% of the seats by management quota.

National level FIDE rated chess tournament 
The Department of Physical Education of AIT along with Elite Chess Academy, Rotary Coimbatore North and JCI Cbe Indcity organised a national level FIDE rated chess tournament between 23 December 2008 and 28 December 2008.

References

External links 
  Official website

Engineering colleges in Coimbatore
All India Council for Technical Education